Norman Broaster Stadium is a multi-purpose stadium in San Ignacio, Cayo, Belize.  It is currently used mostly for football matches and is the home stadium to Verdes FC in the Premier League of Belize (PLB) of the Football Federation of Belize.  

The stadium holds 2,000 people. In 2021, the Football Federation of Belize renovated the stadium's changing rooms.

References

1950s establishments in British Honduras
Football venues in Belize
Belize Premier Football League home stadiums
Multi-purpose stadiums in Belize
Sports venues completed in the 1950s